Jessen is a municipality on the Black Elster river and lies in the eastern part of Saxony-Anhalt in the district of Wittenberg.

Geography
Jessen is an amalgamated municipality, and has the following 44 subdivisions (Ortsteile):

 Arnsdorf
 Battin
 Buschkuhnsdorf
 Dixförda
 Düßnitz
 Gentha
 Gerbisbach
 Glücksburg
 Gorsdorf
 Grabo
 Großkorga
 Hemsendorf
 Holzdorf
 Jessen (Elster)
 Kleindröben
 Kleinkorga
 Klöden
 Klossa
 Kremitz
 Leipa
 Linda
 Lindwerder
 Lüttchenseyda
 Mark Friedersdorf
 Mark Zwuschen
 Mauken
 Mellnitz
 Mönchenhöfe
 Morxdorf
 Mügeln
 Naundorf
 Neuerstadt
 Rade
 Rehain
 Reicho
 Rettig
 Ruhlsdorf
 Schadewalde
 Schöneicho
 Schützberg
 Schweinitz
 Seyda
 Steinsdorf
 Zwuschen

History
The first documentary evidence of Jessen's existence dates to 1217. On the night of 20 to 21 September 1729, much of the town was destroyed in a fire. After belonging to Saxony for centuries, Jessen became Prussian in 1816.

In 1945, it became part of the state of Saxony-Anhalt. In 1952, owing to East German administrative reforms, Jessen became a district capital in the Cottbus region (Cottbus is nowadays in Brandenburg). In 1990, Jessen once again became part of the newly-refounded state of Saxony-Anhalt. In 1992 came the amalgamation of the communities of Grabo, Gorsdorf-Hemsendorf, Lindwerder and Großkorga, and in 1993, Schweinitz, Gerbisbach, Klossa, Schöneicho, Steinsdorf and Dixförda. With the district reform in 1994, Jessen became part of Wittenberg district, as well as having a further three communities melded with it, namely Battin, Düßnitz and Kleindröben-Mauken. In 1999 came further amalgamations: Arnsdorf, Leipa and Ruhlsdorf mit Rehain. On 1 March 2004 came a further 12, among them Seyda, Holzdorf and Linda (Elster). Some of these formerly independent communities themselves each consisted of more than one centre, and so Jessen now has a total of 47 Stadtteile (constituent communities).

Economy and infrastructure
Established businesses are mostly small and mid-sized concerns in metalworking, building, dairy processing and drink production. There are also, however, bigger enterprises in agriculture.

Culture and Sightseeing

Historic marketplace in Jessen
Parish church of St. Nicolai in Jessen
Schloss Jessen (stately home), since 1999 town council seat
Parish church of St. Marien in Schweinitz
Amtshaus in Schweinitz
Gorsdorf village church
Kleindröben village church
Pretzsch-Mauken reaction ferry

Personalities
Karl Lamprecht (25 February 1856 –  10 May 1915 in Leipzig), was Professor of History at the University of Leipzig, who is known today mainly for his rôle in the Methodenstreit.
Herbert Kaiser (16 March 1916 – 5 December 2003) a pilot in the Luftwaffe during World War II

Sundry
The town is Germany's twelfth-largest municipality by land area, and is thereby about 3 km² bigger than Munich.

References

External links

 Jessen

 
Wittenberg (district)